HMS Bangor is a  commissioned by the Royal Navy in 1999. Designed to hunt mines in depths of up to 200 m using the Sonar 2093 Variable Depth Sonar (VDS) meaning that she can conduct mine clearance operations throughout the continental shelf. She is named after the Northern Ireland seaside town of the same name, and the second Royal Navy vessel to bear the name.

History
Through October 2011 Bangor conducted maritime security patrols off Misrata during the NATO military intervention in Libya.

Bangor participated in the 2013 Exercise Joint Warrior. She was stationed on the River Clyde for the 2014 Commonwealth Games in Glasgow. For the duration of the games the general public were allowed on board for a free tour.

In mid-2021, Bangor deployed with HMS Middleton to join the vessels of 9 Mine Countermeasures Squadron operating out of HMS Jufair in Bahrain. Both vessels were upgraded with the Oceanographic Reconnaissance Combat Architecture (ORCA) system which assists vessels with a higher level of mine detection at greater stand-off distances. Bangor and Middleton were to relieve their sister vessels HMS Brocklesby and HMS Shoreham, which were to return to the U.K.

References

External links

 

Sandown-class minehunters
Ships built in Southampton
1999 ships
Minehunters of the United Kingdom